My Buddy: Sonny Stitt Plays for Gene Ammons is an album by saxophonist Sonny Stitt featuring selections associated with his fellow musician Gene Ammons recorded in 1975 and released on the Muse label in 1976.

Reception

Allmusic reviewed the album calling it a "fine tribute album" and stating "this is a high-quality bop set".

Track listing 
 "You Can Depend On Me" (Charles Carpenter, Louis Dunlap, Earl Hines) - 7:13
 "Red Top" (Gene Ammons) - 4:01
 "Exactly Like You" (Dorothy Fields, Jimmy McHugh) - 4:55
 "My Buddy" (Walter Donaldson, Gus Kahn) - 6:12
 "Confirmation" (Charlie Parker) - 4:25
 "Blues for Brad and Kolax" (Sonny Stitt) - 7:05

Personnel 
Sonny Stitt - alto saxophone, tenor saxophone
Barry Harris - piano
Sam Jones - bass 
Leroy Williams - drums

References 

1976 albums
Muse Records albums
Sonny Stitt albums
Albums produced by Bob Porter (record producer)